Svein Arne Øvergaard (1 January 1912 in Kristiania (Oslo) – 23 November 1986 in Oslo) was a Norwegian resistance member, boxer and jazz musician (saxophone, percussion) and band leader, married to Gunhild Øvergaard (born Sandberg, 1912–1996), and known from the jazz scenes of Oslo.

Biography 
Øvergaard played in Willie Vieth's Kaba Orchestra and as leader of the mighty popular Funny Boys (1932–39), he was among the first Norwegian jazz musicians to be known outside of Norway. From 1937 he led since his own orchestra, including with bassist Fred Lange-Nielsen, drummer Per Gregersen, guitarist Finn Westbye, saxophonist Arvid Gram Paulsen, and clarinetist Einar Gustavsen. He also collaborated frequently with drummer Pete Brown and guitarist Robert Normann.

In 1938 he was Norwegian champion in boxing, junior light heavyweight, for the Boxing Club Pugilist. During World War II, he vent to the United Kingdom and became part of Linge Company with telegraph as main work.

Discography 
With Funny Boys
2001: Jazz in Norway vol. 2 1938-43 (RCA)

References

External links 
Picture of his orchestra (1939) at Norsk jazzarkiv

20th-century Norwegian drummers
Norwegian jazz drummers
Male drummers
Norwegian percussionists
Norwegian jazz saxophonists
Norwegian military personnel of World War II
Norwegian Special Operations Executive personnel
1912 births
1986 deaths
Norwegian male boxers
20th-century drummers
20th-century saxophonists
20th-century Norwegian male musicians
Male jazz musicians